Victor Jones (11 May 1881 – 20 July 1923) was an Australian cricketer. He played one first-class match for Western Australia in 1905/06.

See also
 List of Western Australia first-class cricketers

References

External links
 

1881 births
1923 deaths
Australian cricketers
Western Australia cricketers